Galdieriaceae is a family of red algae, one of two families in the order Cyanidiales.

References

Red algae families
 
Monogeneric algae families